Guerilla Bay (postcode: 2536) is a bay and village located in Eurobodalla Shire, the South Coast, New South Wales, Australia. Fishing is banned as the entire area is a sanctuary zone.

Climate
Guerilla Bay experiences an oceanic climate (Köppen climate classification Cfb). The climate of Guerilla bay is moderated by the sea, with warm summers and mild sunny winters. Nights can be cold in winter. Thunderstorms mostly occur between November and March, with rainfall maximums in summer.

References

Towns in New South Wales
Towns in the South Coast (New South Wales)
Bays of New South Wales
Eurobodalla Shire